Sam Purcell (born October 5, 1982) is the current head coach of the Mississippi State Bulldogs women's basketball team. He was previously an assistant at Louisville, Georgia Tech and Tulsa. He began his coaching career as a student coach at Auburn.

Head coaching record

References 

1982 births
Living people
People from Dalton, Georgia
Auburn University alumni
Auburn Tigers women's basketball coaches
Tulsa Golden Hurricane women's basketball coaches
Georgia Tech Yellow Jackets women's basketball coaches
Louisville Cardinals women's basketball coaches
Mississippi State Bulldogs women's basketball coaches
Basketball coaches from Georgia (U.S. state)